The order of precedence in Guatemala is a symbolic hierarchy of officials used to direct protocol. It is regulated by Presidential Decree 07-2003 of March 11, 2003. signed by then President Alfonso Portillo, President of the Congress Efraín Ríos Montt and Former Interior Minister José Adolfo Reyes Calderón.

Order of precedence 
Precedence is determined  by the office; names of incumbents  are listed.
President Alejandro Giammattei 
Vice President Guillermo Castillo Reyes 
President of the Congress Allan Rodríguez
President of the Supreme Court of Justice Néster Vásquez Pimentel
President of the Constitutional Court Dina Ochoa Escribá
President of the Supreme Electoral Tribunal María Eugenia Mijangos
Former Presidents or their widows/widowers (ordered by term):
Vinicio Cerezo
Jorge Serrano Elías
Alfonso Portillo
Óscar Berger
Álvaro Colom
Otto Pérez Molina
Alejandro Maldonado
Jimmy Morales
Former Vice Presidents or their widows/widowers:
Roberto Carpio
Gustavo Espina
Luis Alberto Flores
Juan Francisco Reyes
Eduardo Stein
Rafael Espada
Roxana Baldetti
Jafeth Cabrera
Alfonso Fuentes Soria
Diplomatic corps accredited in Guatemala and accredited diplomatic corps of Guatemala
First Vice President of the Congress Felipe Alejos Lorenzana
Second Vice President of the Congress Javier Hernández Ovalle
Third Vice President of the Congress Dolores Beltrán
First Secretary of the Congress Estuardo Galdámez
Second Secretary of the Congress Karla Martínez
Third Secretary of the Congress Juan Ramón Lau 
Fourth Secretary of the Congress Jaime Lucero
Fifth Secretary of the Congress Jorge Arévalo
Minister of Foreign Affairs Sandra Jovel
Minister of Interior Enrique Antonio Degenhart Asturias
Minister of National Defense Luis Miguel Ralda Moreno
Minister of Public Finances Victor Manuel Martínez Ruiz
Minister of Communications, Infrastructure and Housing José Luis Benito Ruiz
Minister of Education Óscar Hugo López Rivas
Minister of Agriculture, Livestock and Food Mario Estuardo Méndez Cóbar
Minister of Economy Ascisclo Valladares Urruela
Minister of Public Health and Social Assistance Carlos Enrique Soto Menegazzo
Minister of Labor and Social Welfare Gabriel Bladimir Aguilera Bolaños
Minister of Energy and Mines Luis Alfonso Chang Navarro
Minister of Culture and Sports José Luis Chea Urruela
Minister of Environment and Natural Resources Environment and Natural Resources Alfonso Rafael Alonzo
Minister of Social Development Carlos Velásquez Monge
Attorney General of the Nation Jorge Luis Donado Vivar
Attorney General and Chief of Public Prosecutor's Office María Consuelo Porras
Attorney for Human Rights Augusto Jordán Rojas Andrade
Comptroller General of Accounts Carlos Mencos
Secretaries of State
Deputies of the Congress
Chief of Staff of the Army Julio César Paz Bone
Magistrates of the Supreme Court of Justice
Judges of the Constitutional Court
Magistrates of the Supreme Electoral Tribunal
Deputy Ministers of State
Departmental Governors
Mayors
Rectors of the Universities
Rector of the University of San Carlos of Guatemala Murphy Paiz
CEOs
Army Officers
Official Commissions
Private Commissions

References

Guatemala
Government of Guatemala